The women's 50 metre backstroke at the 2013 IPC Swimming World Championships was held at the Parc Jean Drapeau Aquatic Complex in Montreal from 12 to 18 August.

Medalists

See also
List of IPC world records in swimming

References

backstroke 50 m women
2013 in women's swimming